Troxochrus is a genus of sheet weavers that was first described by Eugène Louis Simon in 1884.

Species
 it contains five species.
Troxochrus apertus Tanasevitch, 2011 – Greece, Turkey
Troxochrus laevithorax Miller, 1970 – Angola
Troxochrus rugulosus (Westring, 1851) – Sweden
Troxochrus scabriculus (Westring, 1851) (type) – Europe
Troxochrus triangularis Tanasevitch, 2013 – Israel

See also
 List of Linyphiidae species (Q–Z)

References

Araneomorphae genera
Linyphiidae
Spiders of Africa
Spiders of Asia